Bythitoidei is a suborder of the order Ophidiiformes, the cusk eels. They are distinguished from the other Ophidiform suborder, the Ophidioidei, by being largely viviparous.

Families
The following families make up the suborder Bythitoidei:

 Family Bythitidae Gill, 1861 — viviparous brotulas
 Family Aphyonidae Jordan & Evermann, 1898 —aphyonids, blind cusk-eel
 Family Parabrotulidae Nielsen, 1968 — false brotulas

References

Ophidiiformes